Dorothy Alexander (born Dorothy Sydney Moses; April 22, 1904 – November 17, 1986) was an American ballet dancer, choreographer, teacher, and company director. She was founded what is now called the Atlanta Ballet in 1929.

Early life 
Alexander was born in Atlanta, Georgia, the daughter of Frank Hamilton Moses and Cora Mina Thibadeau. She was one of four children in her family. Her father was a traveling salesman, and served for a time as Atlanta City Clerk. In 1910, she suffered from osteomyelitis, which was treated with a full year of bed rest and a body cast. When she recovered, she began studying dance. Her mother died in 1915 and her father died in 1920.

Career 
Dorothy Moses opened a ballet school in 1921; it is now the Atlanta School of Ballet. In 1925, she graduated from the Atlanta Normal School and began working as an elementary school teacher. In 1927, she began a dance program in the Atlanta Public Schools. She studied in New York City and London. She danced both in New York and Atlanta, working under choreographer Edwin Strawbridge and dance educator Lucile Marsh, as well as with the touring companies of the Hollywood Ballet and the Solomonoff-Menzelli Ballet. Following a brief marriage to Marion Alexander, she founded the Dorothy Alexander Concert Group in 1929; it was renamed the Atlanta Civic Ballet in 1941, and became the Atlanta Ballet in 1968.

Alexander was an advocate for high-quality ballet organizations outside major artistic centers like New York. She found Atlanta to be a "lonely" place for a dance enthusiast, and she worked to support dance and dance education in Atlanta and around the country. In 1956, she organized the Regional Dance America, the first regional dance festival in the United States. She helped to found the National Association for Regional Ballet (NARB) in 1963. She retired from the Atlanta Civic Ballet in 1964 due to illness, but continued to consult for both the ballet and for NARB.

Personal life 
Dorothy Moses married Nashville architect Marion Alexander in 1926; they divorced a year later.

Death 
She died of cancer on November 17, 1986.

Awards and honors 

 Atlanta Woman of The Year in Arts Award, 1947
Dance Magazine Award, 1959 or 1960 (sources vary)
 Georgia Governor's Award, 1976 
 Capezio Dance Award, 1981 
 Honorary doctorate from Emory University, 1986

References 

1904 births
1986 deaths
American women choreographers
American choreographers
American female dancers
American ballerinas
People from Atlanta
20th-century American women
20th-century American ballet dancers